Neya may refer to:
 Neya (town), Kostroma Oblast, Russia
 Neya (river), Kostroma Oblast, Russia
 Michiko Neya, Japanese voice actress
 Neya, a fictional character from the anime Infinite Ryvius

See also 
 Neya Chiefdom, a chiefdom of Sierra Leone
 Neeya (disambiguation)